Paul Swift (August 18, 1934 – October 7, 1994) was an American actor.

Career
Between 1970 and 1977 he appeared in roles in four of the early feature films directed by John Waters. He additionally appeared as himself in two Waters-related documentary films. Swift's most notable role is his appearance as "The Egg Man" in Pink Flamingos (1972). Aside from that, he played mostly bit parts.

Death
Swift died of complications from AIDS, aged 60, in his native Baltimore.

Filmography

References

External links

dreamlandnews.com, DreamlandNews, a John Waters fansite (copyright by Jeff Jackson)

1934 births
1994 deaths
AIDS-related deaths in Maryland
American male film actors
Male actors from Baltimore
20th-century American male actors